The County of Hoya (German: Grafschaft Hoya) was a state of the Holy Roman Empire, located in the present German state of Lower Saxony. It was centered on the town of Hoya on the middle Weser river, between Bremen and Nienburg; the area now belongs to the districts of Nienburg and Diepholz. The largest city of the county was Nienburg.

Geography
As of 1582, Hoya was bordered by (from the north, clockwise): The City of Bremen, the Archbishopric of Bremen, the Bishopric of Verden, the Lüneburg and Calenberg subdivisions of Brunswick-Lüneburg, the Bishopric of Minden, the County of Diepholz, the Bishopric of Münster, and the County of Oldenburg.

History
A first Count Henry at Hoya in Saxony appeared as a vassal of Archbishop Hartwig II of Bremen in 1202. He had disputes with the local Hodenberg noble family at Hodenhagen Castle over their estates on the Weser which were gradually acquired by Count Henry and his descendants until 1313. The acquisition of Nienburg led to a long-term conflict with the Bishops of Minden who baulked at the expansionism of their comital neighbours.

In 1345 the brothers Gerhard III and John II of Hoya, divided the county among themselves. When the elder branch of the Gerhard line at Hoya became extinct in 1497, the territories were re-unified under John's descendant Count Jobst I residing at Nienburg. In 1450 the family became embroiled in the Münster Diocesan Feud, but failed in their attempt to install Erich of Hoya as the Bishop of Münster. In the 16th century, the counts came under pressure from the mighty Dukes of Brunswick-Lüneburg, who in 1512 occupied their estates.

The county was partitioned after Otto VIII, Count of Hoya died without sons in 1582. The majority of the territory was received by the Calenberg line with the remainder to the Lüneburg line of the Duchy of Brunswick-Lüneburg and the Landgraviate of Hesse-Cassel. The Counts of Hoya already had to recognize the Welf dukes of Brunswick-Lüneburg as liege lords in 1512.

After the Austro-Prussian War of 1866, the area together with the Kingdom of Hanover was annexed by Prussia.

Counts of Hoya
 Henry I 1202-1235
 Henry II 1235-1290
 Gerhard II 1290-1313
 Otto II 1313-1324
 Gerhard III 1324-1345 jointly with his brother
 John II

Reunited 
 Jobst I 1497-1507
 Jobst II 1507-1545
 Albert II 1545-1563
 Eric V 1563-1575
 Otto VIII 1575-1582

References

States and territories established in 1202
Counties of the Holy Roman Empire
1200s establishments in the Holy Roman Empire
1202 establishments in Europe
1582 disestablishments in the Holy Roman Empire
Former states and territories of Lower Saxony
Lower Rhenish-Westphalian Circle